In mathematics, in the field of p-adic analysis, the Volkenborn integral is a method of integration for p-adic functions.

Definition 
Let : be a function from the p-adic integers taking values in the p-adic numbers. The Volkenborn integral is defined by the limit, if it exists:

More generally, if

then 

This integral was defined by Arnt Volkenborn.

Examples 

where  is the k-th Bernoulli number.

The above four examples can be easily checked by direct use of the definition and Faulhaber's formula.

The last two examples can be formally checked by expanding in the Taylor series and integrating term-wise.

with  the p-adic logarithmic function and  the p-adic digamma function.

Properties 

From this it follows that the Volkenborn-integral is not translation invariant.

If  then

See also
 P-adic distribution

References 
 Arnt Volkenborn: Ein p-adisches Integral und seine Anwendungen I. In: Manuscripta Mathematica. Bd. 7, Nr. 4, 1972, 
 Arnt Volkenborn: Ein p-adisches Integral und seine Anwendungen II. In: Manuscripta Mathematica. Bd. 12, Nr. 1, 1974,  
 Henri Cohen, "Number Theory", Volume II, page 276

Integrals